Flores is a corregimiento in Tonosí District, Los Santos Province, Panama with a population of 664 as of 2010. Its population as of 1990 was 634; its population as of 2000 was 528.

References

Corregimientos of Los Santos Province